Richard S. "Rick" Clayburgh (born April 8, 1960) is a North Dakota Republican politician and current director of the North Dakota Bankers Association. Clayburgh was elected as the state's Tax Commissioner in 1996, and re-elected in 2000 and 2004. He resigned effective May 2005 to become President and CEO of the North Dakota Bankers Association and Cory Fong was appointed to serve until an election in 2006 (where Fong was elected).  In responding to Clayburgh's resignation, Governor John Hoeven described him as "a dedicated servant of North Dakota for the past twenty years" who had served with "integrity and distinction" and stated that he would be missed.

Clayburgh was well-favored in his 2002 campaign for North Dakota's at-large congressional district against incumbent Democrat Earl Pomeroy, and ran an aggressive campaign including a visit from then-Vice President Dick Cheney in Fargo, North Dakota. He raised over US$1 million for the campaign. Despite the efforts, Pomeroy edged out Clayburgh and won re-election, with 52% of the vote.

See also

2002 United States House of Representatives election in North Dakota

References

Living people
North Dakota Tax Commissioners
Politicians from Grand Forks, North Dakota
North Dakota Republicans
University of North Dakota alumni
1960 births